Abdulwaheed Ibrahim Omar is a Nigerian former trade union leader.

Born in Zaria, Omar joined the Nigeria Union of Teachers, rising to become its president.  He was also elected as deputy president of the Nigeria Labour Congress (NLC).  He was re-elected unopposed in 2011.  He stood down in 2015, at which time his predecessor, Adams Oshiomhole, argued that the federation had lost prestige and influence under Omar's leadership.

References

Year of birth missing (living people)
Living people
Nigerian trade unionists
People from Zaria